The 2019-20 Quinnipiac Bobcats Men's ice hockey season was the 44th season of play for the program and the 15th season in the ECAC Hockey conference. The Bobcats represented the Quinnipiac University and played their home games at the Frank Perrotti, Jr. Arena in the People's United Center, and were coached by Rand Pecknold, in his 26th season.

On March 12, ECAC Hockey announced that the remainder of the tournament was cancelled due to the COVID-19 pandemic.

Roster

As of July 17, 2019.

Standings

Schedule and Results

|-
!colspan=12 style=";" | Exhibition

|-
!colspan=12 style=";" | Regular Season

|- 
!colspan=12 style=";" | 

|-
!colspan=12 style=";" | 
|- align="center" bgcolor="#e0e0e0"
|colspan=12|Remainder of Tournament Cancelled

Scoring Statistics

Goaltending statistics

Rankings

Players drafted into the NHL

2020 NHL Entry Draft

† incoming freshman

References

2019–20
Quinnipiac Bobcats 
Quinnipiac Bobcats 
2019 in sports in Connecticut
2020 in sports in Connecticut